Raymond Keith King (born January 15, 1974) is a retired Major League Baseball relief pitcher. He bats and throws left-handed.

High school and college years
King attended Ripley High School (Ripley, Tennessee) and lettered in football, basketball, and baseball. In baseball, he won All-America honors as a senior. The lefty is also an alumnus of Lambuth University in Jackson, Tennessee.

Professional career
In ten seasons in the major leagues, King appeared in 593 games and pitched 411 innings. He was 20–23 lifetime with a 3.46 ERA, 181 walks, 278 strikeouts and 2 saves. As a batter he was 0–6 at the plate with three strikeouts.

Early career
King's professional baseball career began on June 1, when the Cincinnati Reds selected him in the eighth round of the amateur draft. The southpaw spent the next four seasons playing for minor league affiliates in the Reds, Atlanta Braves and Chicago Cubs organizations before finally making his major league debut on May 21,  as a member of the Cubs.

Milwaukee Brewers
After two different stints with Chicago in 1999, King was dealt to the Milwaukee Brewers the following spring.

Atlanta Braves
That off-season, King was dealt back to Atlanta for infielder Wes Helms and pitcher John Foster. King showed his durability once again, appearing in 80 games as the Braves' primary left-handed reliever. He also made his first career postseason appearance that season, pitching a scoreless inning of relief.

St. Louis Cardinals
The  season was King's finest  in the majors to date. The rubber-armed lefty appeared in a career and team high 86 games for the Cardinals,  also notching career bests in holds (31), wins and earned run average along the way to a 5–2 record and 2.61 ERA. From May to July, King built a 30-game scoreless streak, another personal best. He also pitched 6 innings that postseason as St. Louis captured the National League pennant.

Colorado Rockies
King joined the Colorado Rockies for the  season after a trade from St. Louis for outfielder Larry Bigbie and second baseman Aaron Miles.

Washington Nationals

He joined the Washington Nationals on a minor league contract with an invitation to spring training the following winter. He made the Nationals  Opening Day roster.

Return To Milwaukee
In September 2007, King was acquired by the Brewers in exchange for a player to be named later to help with their playoff run. King completed the 2007 season with a 1-1 record and a 4.76 ERA in 67 games. He became a free agent after the season.

Revisiting Washington
On November 30, King re-signed with the Nationals, to a minor league contract with an invitation to spring training. On March 22, King's minor league contract was purchased by the Nationals, and he thus made the opening day roster. King appeared in 12 games and went 0-0 with a 5.68 ERA during the month of April. On April 24, King was optioned to Triple-A Columbus, but he refused the assignment and declared free agency, never again to appear in a major league game.

Chicago White Sox
In early May 2008, King signed a minor league contract with the Chicago White Sox, but was released after only four appearances.

Houston Astros
On May 29, 2008, King signed a minor league contract with the Houston Astros; he became a free agent at the end of the season.

Scouting report
A lefty specialist with a durable arm, King ranked amongst the top ten National League relievers in appearances from 2001 through 2005. Armed with a late-moving, low 90s fastball and sharp breaking slider, King pitched to the bottom of the strike zone and allowed few home runs. He was also adept at holding runners, and fielding his position, having committed only seven errors in 577 career games.

Facts
Despite almost 600 career games, King has only 2 saves and never started a game.
King holds the second most number of single-season appearances for two organizations; the Atlanta Braves (80 appearances in 2003) and the Milwaukee Brewers (84 appearances in 2001).
King earned Milwaukee's Manager's Award and the Amanda Curran Award for Community Service in 2004.
King went 328 games without issuing an intentional walk, spanning over 4 years. This is the longest known streak of its kind. On August 6, King allowed a leadoff double to Ryan Klesko in the bottom of the 11th inning and intentionally walked Dave Roberts to end the streak. The Giants eventually scored, and King took the loss.  While pitching for the Atlanta Braves, King threw a wild pitch on an intentional walk that scored the game's winning run from third base.

References

External links

1974 births
Living people
Major League Baseball pitchers
Atlanta Braves players
Chicago Cubs players
Colorado Rockies players
Milwaukee Brewers players
St. Louis Cardinals players
Washington Nationals players
Baseball players from Chicago
African-American baseball players
Iowa Cubs players
Indianapolis Indians players
Lambuth Eagles baseball players
Billings Mustangs players
Macon Braves players
Durham Bulls players
Greenville Braves players
West Tennessee Diamond Jaxx players
Harrisburg Senators players
Round Rock Express players
Charlotte Knights players
People from Maricopa County, Arizona
People from Ripley, Tennessee
Sportspeople from the Phoenix metropolitan area
21st-century African-American sportspeople
20th-century African-American sportspeople